The Grand Canyon National Park Superintendent's Residence is an early National Park Service Rustic style building, designed in 1921 by Daniel Ray Hull of the National Park Service Branch of Plans and Designs as the park's first headquarters building. The visitor information room was financed by a donation from the Brooklyn Daily Eagle newspaper. The building was altered in 1931 by Thomas Chalmers Vint to be the park superintendent's residence, superseded as headquarters by the Grand Canyon Park Operations Building It is included in the Grand Canyon Village National Historic Landmark District.

Description
As originally built the structure was a relatively small two-story, L-shaped administrative building with a stone first floor and a frame second floor.  When it was converted to a residence in 1931 it was enlarged in a sympathetic manner, retaining its original design vocabulary. The main living quarters are on the upper level, with eight rooms including the living room, dining room, kitchen, bedrooms and bathrooms, with stone fireplaces in the dining and living rooms. The main entrance is from a porch off the living room. The downstairs features a family room with another stone fireplace, formerly the visitor information office. There remainder of the lower level is occupied by a variety of rooms and winding corridors that connect to a two-car garage. The building is currently used for administrative offices for one of the park's concessionaires.

Historic designation
The Superintendent's Residence was listed on the National Register of Historic Places on September 6, 1974.  It is a major contributing component to the Grand Canyon Village Historic District, a National Historic Landmark District.

See also
Architects of the National Park Service
National Register of Historic Places listings in Grand Canyon National Park
Rustic architecture in Arizona

References

Houses in Arizona
Grand Canyon
Buildings and structures in Grand Canyon National Park
Government buildings in Arizona
Government buildings completed in 1921
Houses completed in 1931
Park buildings and structures on the National Register of Historic Places in Arizona
Houses on the National Register of Historic Places in Arizona
1921 establishments in Arizona
American Craftsman architecture in Arizona
National Park Service rustic in Arizona
National Register of Historic Places in Coconino County, Arizona
National Register of Historic Places in Grand Canyon National Park
Individually listed contributing properties to historic districts on the National Register in Arizona